was a Japanese painter of the yōga (or Western-style) movement in the Meiji era.

Biography
Later he became assistant professor in the Tokyo Imperial University School of Technology.

See also

 Nihonga

References

1859 births
1892 deaths
Yōga painters
People from Satsuma Domain
People from Kagoshima
Artists from Kagoshima Prefecture